The Air Force of the Dominican Republic, is one of the three branches of the Armed Forces of the Dominican Republic, together with the Army and the Navy.

History 
At the end of the United States occupation of the Dominican Republic, which lasted from 1916 to 1924, General Horacio Vásquez was elected president. He began appropriating funds to expand the country's armed forces, as the military had been reduced to a police force during the US occupation. In 1928 the General consolidated the Dominican Army, and passed Law 904, which appropriated $125,000 for the purchase of aircraft for the army. To achieve this, a group of engineers and cadets were sent to an aviation school located in La Habana to form the basis for the new air branch. Until 1942 only about a dozen aircraft were purchased.

The service was renamed  on 26 October 1942. Whilst granting base facilities to the United States during World War II  the Dominican Republic received limited quantities of Lend-Lease military equipment. In 1947 a group of Dominican Republic exiles from Cuba tried to invade the country. The government wanted to receive large quantities of bombers and fighters aircraft from the United States, but the government blocked these sales and prevented sales of the Canadian government to President Trujillo. But agents of the president managed to buy some Beaufighter and Mosquito aircraft from the United Kingdom. After signing the Rio Treaty 1947 the Dominican Republic received large quantities of aircraft, for example 25 P-47D fighter-bomber and 30 AT-6 trainers from the United States. With this influx of aircraft the  expanded and became an independent service on 15 January 1948, and was renamed . It moved its headquarters to Base Aérea Presidente Trujillo, in the capital's suburb of San Isidro.

The Air Force underwent several name changes during the 1950s, being known as the Dominican Military Aviation during 1952-55 and 1957–62 and as the Dominican Air Force during 1955–57. In 1962 it again became known as the Dominican Air Force, the name is still in use today.

In 1952, 25 Vampires and 32 North American P-51D were bought from Sweden but similar purchases from Canada and Japan were again blocked by the United States. By 1956 the Dominican Air Force had about 240 aircraft. During the next years most of the post-war equipment was at the end of its useful life. After the assassination of President Trujillo in 1961 funds for the Air Force decreased and in 1963 the Air Force had only 110 aircraft.

During the next 15 years the number of aircraft in the Air Force declined again and only second-line material, such as training aircraft or helicopters, were acquired. In the early 1980s the Dominican Air Force had about 80 aircraft in five operational squadrons with most of the aircraft and helicopters operating out of San Isidro Air Base in Santo Domingo.

On 22 September 1998 Hurricane George struck San Isidro, the main air force base, and destroyed one hangar and severely damaged another, destroying the aircraft in both hangars. After this new aircraft entered service, including eight ENAER T-35 Pilláns delivered in November 1999-January 2000. During the same period three CASA 212-400 transport planes were ordered.

Air Bases 
San Isidro Air Base
Puerto Plata Air Base

Equipment
The Dominican Air Force was offered 3 Sikorsky SH-3 Sea King helicopters by its U.S allies, but turned the offer down due to that it could not afford the maintenance. In 2007 the Dominican Air Force announced that it would purchase 8 Embraer EMB 314 Super Tucano aircraft from Brazil. By the end of 2008 the purchase was approved with the first two aircraft were delivered in 2009.
In January 2015 the president of the Anti-narcotics agency announced that a Tecnam MMA (Multi Mission Aircraft) would be acquired for maritime surveillance. The contract was signed in September 2015 by Tecnam and the DRAF, with the aircraft was delivered in early December 2016, making the Dominican Republic Air Force the first military user of this aircraft.

On May 11, 2020, the United States Department of Defense revealed that 10 ex-U.S. Navy T-34C Turbo Mentor would be supplied to the Dominican Republic Air Force. No timeline has yet been announced for when the Dominican Republic will receive the aircraft.

Aircraft

Retired

Previous aircraft operated by the Air Force consisted of the P-51D Mustang, P-47D Thunderbolt, de Havilland Mosquito, de Havilland Vampire, PBY Catalina, Boeing B-17, A-37 Dragonfly, C-47, BT-13 Valiant, T-6 Texan, Alouette II / III, Sikorsky H-19, and the Hughes OH-6.

References

Bibliography

World Aircraft information files Brightstar publishing London File 342 Sheet 1

External links
 Fuerza Aérea de República Dominicana 

Dominican Republic
Air Force
Military units and formations established in 1948